Brendan Lynch may refer to:

 Brendan Lynch (Kerry Gaelic footballer) (born 1949), former Gaelic footballer with Kerry
 Brendan Lynch (Roscommon Gaelic footballer) (1923–2014), Irish Gaelic footballer
 Brendan Lynch (music producer), British music producer
 Brendan Lynch (writer) (born 1937), Irish former motor racing journalist and author
 Brendan Lynch (politician) (died 2018), Irish independent politician and Lord Mayor of Dublin
 Brendan Lynch, a contestant on the third series of The Great British Bake Off